Mary Margaret Oliver (born March 7, 1948) is an American politician. She is a member of the Georgia House of Representatives from the 82nd District, serving since 2003. She is a member of the Democratic party. She previously served in the House from a special election in 1987 to 1993, and in the Georgia State Senate from 1993 to 1999.

References

External links 
 Mary Margaret Oliver at house.ga.gov
 Mary Margaret Oliver at ballotpedia.org

Living people
Democratic Party Georgia (U.S. state) state senators
Democratic Party members of the Georgia House of Representatives
1948 births
Politicians from Charleston, South Carolina
21st-century American politicians
21st-century American women politicians
Women state legislators in Georgia (U.S. state)